Curing is a technique for preservation of (usually edible) vegetable material. It involves storing the material in a prescribed  condition immediately after harvest.

Wound healing 
In root and tuber crops such as potatoes and carrots, curing refers to waiting for the healing of wounds by periderm formation. Doing so prolongs shelf life and reduces water loss.

Bulb drying 
In bulb crops such as onion and garlic, "curing" is the process of drying of the neck tissues and of the outer leaves to form dry scales.

Leaf drying 

In leaf crops such as cannabis, tobacco, and tea, curing is a short aging process that dries the product and stops biological processes. For cannabis, this process reduces the content of sugars and chlorophyll.

Other processes referred to as curing 
Vanilla is cured for storage. The beans are killed, sweated (oxidation), slow-dried, and conditioned.

See also 
Tea processing, involves curing

References 

Horticulture